Dave Besteman (born David Robert Besteman), is a former Olympic speed skater.

Biography
Besteman was born on February 2, 1963, in Madison, Wisconsin.

Olympic results

References

1963 births
Living people
American male speed skaters
Speed skaters at the 1992 Winter Olympics
Speed skaters at the 1994 Winter Olympics
Sportspeople from Madison, Wisconsin